William Kendrick may refer to:
William H. Kendrick, soldier, state senator, pioneer and lecturer in Florida
William Kendrick of the Kendrick baronets
Sir William Kendrick, 1st Baronet (died 1684)
Sir William Kendrick, 2nd Baronet (1665–1699)
William Kendrick (footballer)